WORK-IX is an Internet Exchange Point situated in Hamburg (Germany).

Founded in 2002 by Hamburg ISP n@work, it enjoyed some growth, mainly with other regional players and Content Delivery Networks.

In 2007, DE-CIX acquired WORK-IX and took over operations. It continues to provide interconnections for regional traffic. It is open to both eco members and the general public.

External links
 Website of the WORK-IX with traffic statistics

Internet exchange points in Germany